The 2011 Big Ten Conference football season is the 116th for the Big Ten. The conference started its season on Saturday, September 3, as each of the conference's teams began their respective 2011 season of NCAA Division I FBS (Football Bowl Subdivision) competition. This season is Nebraska's first season as a member of the Big Ten, and also marks the creation of conference divisions (named Leaders and Legends), and a championship game. The season was also notable for the Penn State child sex abuse scandal.

For the season, Leaders Division champion Wisconsin finished as conference champion by defeating Legends Division champion Michigan State in the 2011 Big Ten Football Championship Game. Penn State was Leaders Division co-Champion, while Legends Division runner-up Michigan finished with the conference's best record. The conference earned two BCS bowl invitations and compiled a 4–6 overall record in 2011–12 NCAA football bowl games.

The Conference had six 2011 College Football All-America Team consensus selections: Montee Ball, Kevin Zeitler, David Molk, Whitney Mercilus (unanimous), Devon Still, and Jerel Worthy, with the Rimington Trophy going to Molk and the Ted Hendricks Award going to Mercilus.  Ball won the Chicago Tribune Silver Football and the conference's players won four national statistical championships: Russell Wilson (passing efficiency), Raheem Mostert (kickoff return average), Ball (scoring), and Mercilus (quarterback sacks).

Following the season the conference contributed 41 to the  2012 NFL Draft, including 4 in the first round: Riley Reiff (23rd), Mercilus (26th), Zeitler (27th), and A. J. Jenkins (30th).

Rankings

Spring games
April 9
Purdue Boilermakers
April 16
Indiana Hoosiers
Iowa Hawkeyes
Michigan Wolverines
Nebraska Cornhuskers
Northwestern Wildcats
Penn State Nittany Lions
April 23
Illinois Fighting Illini
Minnesota Golden Gophers
Ohio State Buckeyes
Wisconsin Badgers
April 30
Michigan State Spartans

Regular season 

All times Eastern time.

Rankings reflect that of the AP poll.

Week 1

Week 2

Week 3

Week 4

Week 5

Week 6

Week 7

Week 8

Week 9

Week 10

Week 11

Week 12

Week 13

Big Ten Championship Game

Players of the week

Attendance

Post-season awards and honors

Individual Big Ten Award Winners 
 Griese-Brees Quarterback of the Year: Russell Wilson, Wisconsin
 Richter-Howard Receiver of the Year: Marvin McNutt, Iowa
 Ameche-Dayne Running Back of the Year: Montee Ball, Wisconsin
 Kwalick-Clark Tight End of the Year: Drake Dunsmore, Northwestern
 Rimington-Pace Offensive Lineman of the Year: David Molk, Michigan
 Smith-Brown Defensive Lineman of the Year: Devon Still, Penn State
 Butkus-Fitzgerald Linebacker of the Year: Lavonte David, Nebraska
 Tatum-Woodson Defensive Back of the Year: Alfonzo Dennard, Nebraska
 Bakken-Andersen Kicker of the Year: Brett Maher, Nebraska
 Eddleman-Fields Punter of the Year: Brett Maher, Nebraska

All-Big Ten 
The following players were named by the coaches.:

HONORABLE MENTION: Illinois: Jeff Allen, Jonathan Brown, Derek Dimke, Terry Hawthorne, Ian Thomas; Indiana: Mitch Ewald, Jeff Thomas; Iowa: Broderick Binns, James Ferentz, Eric Guthrie, Micah Hyde, James Morris, Markus Zusevics; Michigan: Kenny Demens, J.T. Floyd, Kevin Koger, Junior Hemingway, Denard Robinson, Fitzgerald Toussaint, Ryan Van Bergen; Michigan State: Denicos Allen, Le'Veon Bell, Kenshawn Martin, Trenton Robinson, Marcus Rush; Minnesota: Kim Royston; Nebraska: Will Compton, Ben Cotton, Spencer Long, Marcel Jones, Baker Steinkuhler; Northwestern: Jeremy Ebert, Jordan Mabin, Brian Mulroe, Al Netter, Dan Persa, Brian Peters; Ohio State: Johnathan Hankins, Dan Herron, Jack Mewhort, Jake Stoneburner; Penn State: Drew Astorino, Anthony Fera, Jordan Hill, D'Anton Lynn, Derek Moye, Chima Okoli, Chaz Powell, Johnnie Troutman; Purdue: Joe Holland, Dennis Kelly; Wisconsin: Jared Abbrederis, Patrick Butrym, Antonio Fenelus, Peter Konz, Brad Nortman, Jacob Pedersen, Ricky Wagner.

The following players were named by the media panel.

HONORABLE MENTION: Illinois: Derek Dimke, Terry Hawthorne, Travon Wilson; Indiana: Mitch Ewald; Iowa: Mike Daniels, James Ferentz, Adam Gettis, Eric Guthrie, James Morris, Tyler Nielsen, Shaun Prater, Markus Zusevics; Michigan: Kenny Demens, J.T. Floyd, Kevin Koger, Jordan Kovacs, Taylor Lewan, Craig Roh, Fitzgerald Toussaint, Ryan Van Bergen; Michigan State: Le'Veon Bell, Max Bullough, Dan Conroy, Kirk Cousins, Darqueze Dennard, Brian Linthicum, Chris McDonald, Chris Norman, Kevin Pickelman, Marcus Rush; Minnesota: Chris Bunders, Kim Royston; Nebraska: Mike Caputo, Austin Cassidy, Will Compton, Ben Cotton, Marcel Jones, Cameron Meredith, Daimion Stafford, Baker Steinkuhler; Northwestern: Kain Colter, Jordan Mabin, Brian Mulroe, Al Netter, Dan Persa; Ohio State: C.J. Barnett, Mike Brewster, Johnathan Hankins, Jack Mewhort, Tyler Moeller, Andrew Norwell, Jake Stoneburner, Andrew Sweat; Penn State: Drew Astorino, Quinn Barham, Jack Crawford, Jordan Hill, D'Anton Lynn, Chima Okoli, Chaz Powell, Nate Stupar, Johnnie Troutman; Purdue: Ricardo Allen, Dwayne Beckford, Joe Holland, Dennis Kelly, Carson Wiggs; Wisconsin: Jared Abbrederis, Patrick Butrym, Aaron Henry, Brad Nortman, Nick Toon, Ricky Wagner, Philip Welch.

National Award Winners
 David Molk, Michigan – Rimington Trophy
 Whitney Mercilus, Illinois – Ted Hendricks Award

First Team All-Americans
There are many outlets that award All-America honors in football.  The NCAA uses five official selectors to also determine Consensus and Unanimous All-America honors.  The five teams used by the NCAA to compile the consensus team are from the Associated Press, the AFCA, the FWAA, The Sporting News and the Walter Camp Football Foundation.  A point system is used to calculate the consensus honors.  The point system consists of three points for first team, two points for second team and three points for third team. No honorable mention or fourth team or lower are used in the computation.

The teams are compiled by position and the player accumulating the most points at each position is named a Consensus All-American. If there is a tie at a position in football for first team then the players who are tied shall be named to the team.  A player named first-team by all five of the NCAA-recognized selectors is recognized as a Unanimous All-American.

Academic All-American
The Big Ten led all conferences with 7 Academic All-America selections: 1st team – Rex Burkhead (Nebraska), Austin Cassidy (Nebraska), Patrick Ward (Northwestern) and Joe Holland (Purdue); 2nd team – Mike Sadler (Michigan State), Sean Fisher (Nebraska) and Jacob Schmidt (Northwestern). Cassidy was one of four repeat first-team winners, while Holland was a 2010 second-team selection.

Bowl games

2012 NFL Draft

The conference lost 4 players in the first round of the NFL Draft: A total of 41 Big Ten players were drafted.

Head coaches

 Ron Zook and Vic Koenning (for bowl game), Illinois
 Kevin R. Wilson, Indiana
 Kirk Ferentz, Iowa
 Brady Hoke, Michigan
 Mark Dantonio, Michigan State
 Jerry Kill, Minnesota

 Bo Pelini, Nebraska
 Pat Fitzgerald, Northwestern
 Luke Fickell, Ohio State
 Joe Paterno (first nine games) and Tom Bradley (last three games), Penn State
 Danny Hope, Purdue
 Bret Bielema, Wisconsin

Joe Paterno was fired as head coach of the Penn State Nittany Lions on November 9 in the wake of the Penn State sex abuse scandal. Defensive coordinator Tom Bradley was named interim head coach for the remainder of the season.

Notes
 July 28–29, 2011 – Media Days in Chicago.

References

Sources